The Hamburg Maritim Foundation (Stiftung Hamburg Maritim) is a legally responsible foundation based in Hamburg, Germany and was founded in 2001.

Overview 
The Hamburg Maritime Foundation has set itself the task of preserving evidence of the maritime history of the Free and Hanseatic City of Hamburg and the Hamburg metropolitan region. It preserves and restores traditional ships, port railways and port facilities, their equipment and facilities as well as structural facilities that represent the history of the Port of Hamburg and shipping. The aim is not only to conserve the objects, but to operate them in a functional manner and make them accessible to the general public.

It was founded by the Hamburgische Landesbank on the initiative of the Hamburg Chamber of Commerce. The Commerz-Collegium zu Altona was one of the first sponsors. The work is continuously supported by the Freundeskreis Maritimes Erbe Hamburg e. V.

The Foundation is managed by a four-member Board of Directors. A board of trustees consisting of twelve people controls the executive board and makes fundamental decisions. The Advisory Board includes a representative from each works association and the harbourmaster, as well as a representative from the Hamburg Port Authority. Since 2015, a "steering group" has been active as a permanent representative of the advisory board. Its members represent the advisory board in operational business.

Task 
The foundation is active in the fields of restoration, preservation and operation. The restoration of historical objects requires a high degree of professional competence and care. To this end, the foundation works with shipyards and specialized companies, but also with training and funding institutions.

For many, the ships and the port itself are part of their history. In the associations that operate the ships and facilities, this personal bond leads to a large voluntary commitment to the preservation of maritime heritage. Under the umbrella of the foundation, around 1,700 volunteers are involved in the maintenance and operation of the traditional ships and port railways as well as port facilities. Thanks to the volunteers, who work in independent associations, the ships and a railcar of the port railway can also be experienced by everyone on public trips.

Exhibits

Museum ships 
Sailing cargo ship Undine and steel barque Peking are still undergoing restoration.

Sea worthy ships 

 Sailing ship Catarina
 Sailing ship Johanna
 Schooner No.5 Elbe
 Tugboat Fairplay VIII
 Racing yacht Heti
 Deep-sea cutter Landrath Küster
 Steamship Schaarhorn
 Inspection boat Süderelbe
 Fishing cutter Greta 
 Cargo ship Bleheim

Stationary ships 

 Freighter Hermann
 Bucket chain excavator Alster
 Port barge Porto Alegre
 Salvage steamer Flint III

Historic sites

Port facilities and quay sheds 
The Shed 50 on Australiastraße are among Hamburg's oldest surviving port facilities and are the last surviving quay sheds from the Imperial Germany era. When the building complex was completed in 1910, it was a figurehead for Hamburg's port industry and was considered the most modern port facility of the time. The construction of the storage shed was groundbreaking for the economic handling of goods, while aspects of social reform were taken into account for the first time with the associated company buildings.

In 2002, the foundation took over the Shed 50 from HHLA Hamburger Hafen und Lagerhaus (today: Logistik) AG and from the Free and Hanseatic City of Hamburg, with the condition that it be restored entirely from its own funds. This saved the historic buildings from demolition. The Shed 50 is now a listed building.

Even today, the Shed 50 is managed by commercially active storekeepers who store goods and spices there. The Hamburg Harbor Museum is located in Shed 50A.

Port railways 
The foundation also includes track systems and track vehicles, which are managed by the “Verein der Historische Hafenbahn e. V.” are operated. The port railway has been the most important connection between the port and the hinterland since the second half of the 19th century and is therefore still an indispensable part of the ensemble of monuments. Historical goods handling is carried out on the tracks at various events, for example between historical trucks, the port railway and the cargo ship Bleichen.

The stock of the historic port railway comprises a total of 29 vehicles, including two steam storage locomotives, workshop wagons, various freight wagons, a transport wagon with a hand crane from 1869, a trolley and the VT 4.42 railbus. Every second Saturday of the month, the rail bus can be used to travel along the 300 kilometers of HPA tracks.

Emigrant town on the Veddel 
From 1900, Albert Ballin had the Ballinstadt named after him built on the Veddel in Hamburg. Sleeping and living pavilions, dining halls, baths, churches, synagogues and rooms for medical examinations were built for the emigrants who were transported on the ships of the then HAPAG. The foundation developed the overall concept for the emigration museum.

References 

Companies established in 2001
History of Hamburg
Maritime museums in Germany
Tourist attractions in Hamburg